Neohaemonia melsheimeri is a species of aquatic leaf beetle in the family Chrysomelidae. It is found in North America.

References

Further reading

 

Donaciinae
Articles created by Qbugbot
Beetles described in 1845